The phonology of the Maastrichtian dialect, especially with regards to vowels is quite extensive due to the dialect's tonal nature.

Consonants

  are bilabial, whereas  are labiodental.
  is realized as a bilabial approximant  in the onset and as labio-velar  in the coda.
 Voiceless plosives are unaspirated, whereas the voiced plosives are fully voiced.
  are laminal postalveolar.
 Word-initial  is restricted to loanwords.
  is a voiced fricative trill, with the fricative component varying between uvular  and post-velar . The fricative component is particularly audible in the syllable coda, where a partial devoicing to  also occurs.
 A non-phonemic glottal stop  is inserted between a syllable-final  and the following vowel.
The extra syllable is not shown in the orthography.

Vowels

 The vowel phonemes of Maastrichtian Limburgish can be categorized as short lax , short tense , long lax , long tense , diphthongal  and the unstressed-only .
  are phonological diphthongs, akin to Standard Dutch  (which is how  transcribe the Maastrichtian sounds). They are diphthongal  when combined with Accent 1 and monophthongal  when combined with Accent 2.
A phonemic  appears in French loanwords such as   'brawn'.
The underlying  does not participate in tonal distinction.
 The open-mid  contrast not only with the close-mid  but also with the open  in (near)-minimal pairs such as   'ours' vs.   vs.   'choice'.

Taking all of that into consideration, the vocalic phonemes of Maastrichtian can be classified much like those found in other Limburgish dialects:

Phonetic realization
 The lax  are all close-mid; in addition,  is central: .
 The long close-mid monophthongs  have a very similar allophonic variation to : they are monophthongal  when combined with Accent 2. When combined with Accent 1, they are realized as narrow diphthongs , especially in the word-final position. Because of that, this slight allophonic variation is ignored elsewhere in the article.
 Among the front rounded vowels, all but  are central. In the rest of the article, they are transcribed with the simple symbols , not least because they are phonologically front, as they are the umlauted versions of the corresponding back vowels ( in the case of ).
  are in free variation with weakly diphthongal  (with  being central  like  and ) that glide towards the close-mid , rather than the close . When combined with Accent 1, it is always diphthongal .
  is mid .
  is near-open near-front , whereas  is open near-front .

Vowel+glide sequences
The labial  combines only with short vowels, whereas the palatal  can be preceded by both short and long vowels. Thus,   '(I) offer' does not rhyme with   'that (one)', nor does   'cows' rhyme with   'billiard cue'. These are among the subtlest phonetic distinctions in the dialect.

As noted above, the distinction between diphthongs and vowel+glide sequences is not clear-cut. Among the phonological diphthongs, especially  and  combined with Accent 1 phonetically resemble the vowel+glide sequences. There is no * sequence to rival the diphthong . In that regard, Maastrichtian is much like the Weert dialect, in which the three phonemic closing diphthongs are also associated with vowel+glide sequences in words with Accent 1, although they begin more open in Weert: . Furthermore, the term Accent 1 stands merely for a short vowel in Weert, with the vowel+glide sequences  being the shorter than the diphthongs .

Phonotactics
  occurs only in unstressed syllables.
 The short lax vowels must be followed by a coda. A number of interjections (such as   'yes?') violate this rule.
 The short tense  as well as the phonological diphthongs  are banned before coda .
 Before a final , the short lax vowels are rare.

Stress and tone

Stress location is the same as in the Standard Dutch cognates. Main stress is regularly on the penultimate syllable. The intonational system is much like that of Standard Dutch and Standard German.

As many other Limburgish dialects, the Maastrichtian dialect features a distinction between Accent 1 and Accent 2, limited to stressed syllables. The former can be analyzed as lexically toneless, whereas the latter as an underlying high tone. Phonetically, syllables with Accent 2 are considerably longer. An example of a minimal pair is  'to rinse' vs.  'to play'. The difference is not marked in the orthography, so that both of those words are spelled .

 claims that the difference lies only in length, and that there is no tonal contrast anywhere. However, research shows that there is a crucial difference between words like   'fire' and those like   'bride', as words of the former type have the pitch features typical of Accent 2, whereas the latter do not. Despite that, the Mestreechter Taol dictionary transcribes it as a length distinction, with Accent 2 being transcribed as longer than Accent 1.

The distribution of the tonal contrast is rather erratic. It occurs in the following contexts:
 The tense vowels , unless  follows;
 The long tense  followed by coda ;

This means that neither the short tense  nor the long lax  participate in the tonal contrast, being toneless by default.

Sample
The sample text is a reading of the first sentence of The North Wind and the Sun.

Phonetic transcription

Orthographic version

References

Bibliography

 
 
 
 

Germanic phonologies